Skin Turns to Glass is the second full-length album by drone doom band Nadja. It was released on October 27, 2003, by NOTHingness Records and was limited to 120 copies. The album was made when Nadja was still a solo effort of Aidan Baker's, prior to Leah Buckareff joining in 2005.

The album was re-issued by The End Records on April 1, 2008, with the entire album remastered and extended (with the exception of "Slow Loss"). Also, this edition of the album contains an untitled 28 minute ambient bonus track played after "Slow Loss."

Critical reception
The Quietus wrote: "The attention to detail is never anything less than immaculate. The sensuous drag of ‘Skin Turns To Glass’ features squalls of multi-tracked guitar lines producing birdsong as a veritable Glen Branca of a guitar orchestra provides the snail-slow rumble." Exclaim! called the album "yet another display of densely layered guitars, buried vocals, achingly slow build-ups and barely audible drum machine patterns."

Track list

Original edition

2008 Reissue

Personnel

2008 Re-Issue
Aidan Baker – guitar, vocals, flute, piano, drum programming
Leah Buckareff – bass, vocals

References

External links
2008 edition of "Skin Turns to Glass"
2003 edition of "Skin Turns to Glass"

2003 albums
Nadja (band) albums